Pharo House, also known as The Pratt House, is a historic home located in Middletown, New Castle County, Delaware.  It was built around 1885, and is a -story, five bay "L"-shaped frame dwelling with a steep gable roof. It has a one-story, flat roofed addition on the ell added in the 1940s. It features two four-window bays that project from the main block and a full width front porch. Also on the property are the contributing granary or barn, battery house, and Big Chicken House or Breeder House.

It was listed on the National Register of Historic Places in 1984.

References

Houses on the National Register of Historic Places in Delaware
Houses completed in 1885
Houses in New Castle County, Delaware
National Register of Historic Places in New Castle County, Delaware